Puya Meithaba (Burning of the puya) refers to the annual commemoration of a legendary 18th-century scripture burning in post-colonial Manipur or to the original libricide in itself. Organised by the Meitei National Front (and others) since 1979, the event has been a critical tool in the spread of Meitei nationalism and has mainstreamed a particular reconstruction of history, which has come to be uncritically reproduced even in academic publications.

According to local narratives, King Pamheiba (var. Garib Niwaz), after his conversion to Vashnavism went to extraordinary lengths to wipe out the local religion of Meiteis. Of his multifaceted oppressions, the most significant was the mass-incineration of traditional texts written in the Meitei script — Puyas. Highlighting the rupture of their transcendental way of life under Garib Niwaz, the commemorative event began in 1979 with burning of books that portrayed Meiteis as Hindus, but over the years converged onto more peaceful forms of cultural expression, encouraging the revival of the Meitei script.

Background 

In April 1704, Charairongba became the first Manipuri King to be initiated into Vaishnavism — coins inscribing "Sri Krishna" were minted etc. Despite, his son Pamheiba (var. Garib Nawaz) shew no inclination towards Vaishnavism even after coronation, as evident from his patronage of several shrines for ''lai''s and adopting Meitei funerary rituals on Charairongba's death. However, in 1715, Pamheiba adopted the Sakta tradition under one Bengali Brahmin and two years later, would initiate into the Gaudiya Vaishnava tradition under Guru Gopal Das — nonetheless, patronage of Meitei sites continued as before alongside construction of Hindu temples etc. 

C. 1720, Santa Das Goswami, a missionary from Sylhet arrived in his court and went on to gain tremendous influence; he would initiate Pamheiba into Ramanandi Vaishnavism as the most appropriate sect for warriors. This fitted to Pamheiba's expansionist ambitions esp. in light of the perpetual wars with Burma, and, in the words of Rodney Sebastian, he would reframe kingship and the concept of sovereign from within the religio-political authority of Ramanandi Vaishnavism. The cultural milieu of Manipur was extensively Hindu-ised — mass-conversion rites were held frequently, translation of Puranas and Ramayana into Meitei were commissioned, Hindu cultural norms like prohibition on beef were legalized, and Meitei festivals were hybridized with Hindu ones while lai shrines were destroyed, images of Meitei deities dismantled and recast into coins, and worship of some lais consigned only to the Brahmins — though the aggressiveness relaxed with time, probably in face of increasing opposition from the subjects and even other members of royal family.

In contemporary Meitei narrative, Pamheiba's reign serves as a moment of rupture in their transcendental history demarcated by the unbridled rise of Brahmins. He is alleged to have violently suppressed Sanamahism, the local religion as referred to today, and forcibly imposed Vaishnavism on his subjects via different oppressive means to the extent of banishing those who refused to convert.

Book burning 
Popular narrative and certain local scholars hold that during the reign of Garib Nawaz, Puyas — the ancient traditional texts of Meiteis — were destroyed at his orders. The precise date is disputed. Since viewed as part of an overall royal policy to purge traditional knowledge systems, this alleged libricide has spawned multiple strands of narratives in popular Meitei culture. It is also held that the usage of Bengali script in place of Meitei Mayek began after this purge.

Details of the precise accounts vary among the local populace and are often legendary in nature — some mention that the puyas were scheduled to be incinerated but flew away from the fire, another version mentions that they were indeed burnt but copies were already made of them, yet another mentions that they were successfully transported out of the valley, whilst some even hold that the puyas were written in water-resistant ink and preserved underwater. Local scholars have even produced lists of the burnt Puyas. A few however doubt the authenticity of the event, too.

Historicity 
No primary source exists for the event. Gangmumei Kamei notes that the libricide was referenced for the first time in the works of Khumanthem Kaomacha, a Brahmin balladist-turned-historian in his 1934 publication — Manipur Itibritti. Pandita-Raja Atombapu Sharma reiterated these claims in his 1952 work Pakhangba and the claim soon made into every local publication.

While some mention the event to have been chronicled in the Cheitharol Kumbaba, scholars reject these claims. The manuscript of the royal chronicle in Meitei Mayek, preserved by the royal palace and authorized by the last Maharajah Bodhchandra Singh, don't mention any such libricide. A 1925 Bengali transliteration (published c. 1945–1946) by Thongam Madhab, a royal scribe employed under Meidingngu Churachand, does not mention anything similar either. However, some late apocryphal manuscripts of the Cheitharol Kumbaba mention, that on the 17th of Mera (?) in Sakabda 1654 (1732 CE), Meitei texts were destroyed by the incumbent king Garib Nawaz. These variant versions, which claim of a libricide, change a single word in the particular line — "Meetei Leima manghanye" to "Meetei Lairik manghanye". Parratt holds that these copies were likely forged to support the collective memory. The latest "official" edition of the chronicle, brought out by Manipuri Sahitya Parishad, has since reverted to the palace manuscript. 

Carmen Brandt, Jyotirmoy Ray (and many others) have doubted the historicity of the libricide and criticized scholars who had uncritically accepted the popular narratives — various local sources give low (and contradictory) values about the number of burnt scripts, numerous documents were written in Meitei during the reign of Garib Nawaz including the very Cheitharol Kumbaba, and Nawaz's attitude towards religion might be well-described as ambivalent. In any case, the puyas are still found in Manipur.

Commemoration 
The narrative about the burning of Puyas alongside the forced change of script occupies a prominent place in the collective memory of the Meiteis as to their religious past. It has become increasingly popular in Manipur since, in 1979, the nationalist-revivalists (from under the banner of Meitei National Front) decided to commemorate the libiricide in a heavily publicized annual event on the 23rd of January and evoke nostalgia for the Meitei script which was in disuse. The main function remains restricted to the Sanamahi Temple at Imphal. The 1979 commemoration had burnt books that portrayed Meiteis as Hindus; the attendees grew in number over the years but of late, the event has took on more peaceful forms. Brandt notes such events to "serve the construction of a history of oppression" and thus, strengthen Meitei nationalism.

Notes

References

Bibliography

 
 
 
 
 
 
 
 
 
 
 
 
 

 

History of Manipur
Meitei culture